Thomas Mitchell (1857 – July 18, 1942) was a United States Navy sailor and a recipient of the United States military's highest decoration, the Medal of Honor.

Born in 1857 in New York, New York, Mitchell joined the Navy from that state. On that day, he rescued a shipmate, First Class Boy M. F. Caulan, from drowning. For this action, he was awarded the Medal of Honor five years later, on October 18, 1884.

Mitchell's official Medal of Honor citation reads:
Serving on board the U.S.S. Richmond, Mitchell rescued from drowning, M. F. Caulan, first class boy, serving with him on the same vessel, at Shanghai, China, 17 November 1879.

Mitchell left the Navy while still a landsman. He died on July 18, 1942, at age 84 or 85 and was buried at Long Island National Cemetery in Suffolk County, New York.

See also

List of Medal of Honor recipients during peacetime

References

External links

1857 births
1942 deaths
Military personnel from New York City
United States Navy sailors
United States Navy Medal of Honor recipients
Non-combat recipients of the Medal of Honor